Anthony Caminetti (July 30, 1854 – November 17, 1923) was an American lawyer and politician who served two terms as a United States representative from California from 1891 to 1895.

Biography
Born in Jackson, California, Caminetti was the son of Italian emigrants. He attended the public schools of his native county, the grammar schools in San Francisco, and the University of California, Berkeley. He also studied law and was admitted to the bar in 1877 and commenced practice in Jackson. He was the district attorney of Amador County from 1878 until 1882.

He married Ellen Martin, a native of California. She descended from the distinguished Madison family. Her great-grandmother was President Madison's own cousin. Her great-grandfather, George Holland, was a First Lieutenant in the Continental army, and was with Washington at Valley Forge. His oath of allegiance is on file at the Department of State, being one of the few documents preserved from the destructive hands of the English in the war of 1812. When her husband was unable to be present at the Democratic Convention in Sacramento, Ellen Martin went before the Convention and made his speech of acceptance for him. In commenting on this one of the newspapers of California said: "People who think that women have no influence in politics ought to have attended the Democratic Convention in Sacramento yesterday. Mrs. Caminetti presided and dictated the course of the proceedings with grace and precision of purpose unexpected from the gentler sex." Her work in Washington during a session of the Fifty-third Congress, against a bill that she opposed, elicited a complimentary editorial from a San Francisco paper. Ellen Martin was prominently connected with educational work in California, and was a member of the Board of Education of her county.

Caminetti served in the California State Assembly in 1883–1885. In 1886 his son was born, Farley Drew Caminetti.

He was also a member of the State Senate from 1885 to 1887. He was elected as a Democrat to the Fifty-second and Fifty-third United States Congresses (March 4, 1891 – March 3, 1895). While in Congress, he proposed a bill in 1892 that would have eliminated Yosemite National Park, prompting a campaign by the Sierra Club President John Muir to kill the bill. He was an unsuccessful candidate in 1894 for reelection to the Fifty-fourth Congress. He was a delegate to the Democratic National Convention in 1896 and again a member of the State assembly from 1897 until 1901. In April 1897, he was appointed code commissioner and served until July 31, 1899.

He was member of the State Senate from 1907 to 1913 and served as United States Commissioner General of Immigration from 1913 to 1921. In 1913, his son, Farley Drew Caminetti, was arrested under the Mann Act when he took his mistress to Reno, Nevada across the state line.

As immigration chief he argued that the U.S. Congress should end all immigration of Chinese, Japanese, and Malays because they represented the "Asiatic menace."  In 1915 he was assigned to the National Employment Bureau. In 1917, he was appointed a member of the War Industries Board and after the war was sent to Europe to investigate conditions there.  He engaged in the practice of law in Jackson, California until his death in 1923. He was buried in the Protestant Cemetery.

References

Further reading
 Acherman, Kenneth D., Young J. Edgar: Hoover, The Red Scare, and The Assault on Civil Liberties. New York: Carroll & Graf. 2007. . ("Asiatic menace" on page 54).
 Giovinco, Joseph P., The California Career of Anthony Caminetti, Italian-American Politician.'' Ph.D. dissertation, University of California at Berkeley, 1973.

External links
Join California Anthony Caminetti

1854 births
1923 deaths
Democratic Party members of the United States House of Representatives from California
Democratic Party California state senators
Democratic Party members of the California State Assembly
People from Jackson, California
University of California, Berkeley alumni
District attorneys in California
Anti-Asian sentiment in the United States
American people of Italian descent